The Billboard Global 200 is a chart that ranks the best-performing songs globally. Its data, published by Billboard magazine and compiled by MRC Data, is based on digital sales and online streaming from over 200 territories worldwide. Another similar chart is the Billboard Global Excl. US chart, which follows the same formula except it covers all territories excluding the US. The two charts launched on September 19, 2020.

On the Global 200, seven singles reached number one in 2020. Nine artists—Cardi B, Megan Thee Stallion, BTS, Jawsh 685, Jason Derulo, Ariana Grande, Bad Bunny, Jhay Cortez, and Mariah Carey—reached the top of the chart, all for the first time. BTS scored three number-one singles, the most of any artist, and spent a combined five weeks on top of the chart. Their song "Dynamite" tied with "WAP" by Cardi B featuring Megan Thee Stallion and "Dákiti" by Bad Bunny and Jhay Cortez as the longest-running number-one of the year, each leading the chart for three weeks.

On the Global Excl. US, six singles reached number one in 2020. Six artists—Maluma, BTS, Blackpink, Ariana Grande, Bad Bunny, and Jhay Cortez—reached the top of the chart, all for the first time. BTS scored two number-one singles, the most of any artist, and spent a combined seven weeks on top of the chart. Their song "Dynamite" was the longest-running number one of the year, leading the chart for six weeks.

Chart history

See also 
 2020 in music
 List of Billboard 200 number-one albums of 2020
 List of Billboard Hot 100 number ones of 2020

References

Global 200
2020